Talikoti also Talikot is a taluq in Vijaypur district in the northern part of the Indian state of Karnataka, about 85 kilometres to the southeast of Vijayapura city. It lies on the river called Doni. It is famous for the Battle of Talikota in 1565.

Geography
It has an average elevation of 509 metres (1669 feet).

Demographics
 India census, Talikota had a population of 68,217. Males constitute 56% of the population and females 44%. Talikoti has an average literacy rate of 72%, higher than the national average of 59.5%: male literacy is 81%, and female literacy is 62%. In Talikoti, 22% of the population is under 6 years of age.

See also
Bijapur
Muddebihal
Basavana Bagewadi
Sindagi
Bagalkot
Karnataka

References

Cities and towns in Bijapur district, Karnataka

mg:Talikota
ms:Talikota
pl:Talikota